Manabo, officially the Municipality of Manabo, is a 5th class municipality in the province of Abra, Philippines. According to the 2020 census, it has a population of 11,611 people.

Etymology

The name “Manabo” came from the word “Anabo”, a thorny herb used for making twines of rope, growing luxuriantly in the fields between San Jose Sur and Poblacion. One time during the Spanish regime, a group of Spaniards passed by the place and asked the name of the thorny herb. The people answered “Anabo”. From that time on, the Spaniards called the place Manabo.

The first inhabitants of Manabo were Tinguians who came from Mountain Province. They settled in the place before the arrival of the Spaniards and the Tinguians were known to be peace loving people.

Manabo is politically subdivided into 11 barangays, namely: Ayyeng, Catacdegan Nuevo, Catacdegan Viejo, Luzong, San Jose Norte, San Juan Norte, San Juan Sur, San Ramon East, San Ramon west and Santo Tomas.

Geography

According to the Philippine Statistics Authority, the municipality has a land area of  constituting  of the  total area of Abra.

Barangays
Manabo is politically subdivided into 11 barangays. These barangays are headed by elected officials: Barangay Captain, Barangay Council, whose members are called Barangay Councilors. All are elected every three years.

Climate

Demographics

In the 2020 census, Manabo had a population of 11,611.

Economy

Government
Manabo, belonging to the lone congressional district of the province of Abra, is governed by a mayor designated as its local chief executive and by a municipal council as its legislative body in accordance with the Local Government Code. The mayor, vice mayor, and the councilors are elected directly by the people through an election which is being held every three years.

Elected officials

References

External links

 [ Philippine Standard Geographic Code]

Municipalities of Abra (province)
Populated places on the Abra River